Lockwood Township is a township in Dade County, in the U.S. state of Missouri.

Lockwood Township takes its name from the community of Lockwood, Missouri.

References

Townships in Missouri
Townships in Dade County, Missouri